The following is a list of the 507 communes of the Seine-et-Marne department of France.

The communes cooperate in the following intercommunalities (as of 2020):
Communauté d'agglomération Coulommiers Pays de Brie
Communauté d'agglomération Grand Paris Sud Seine-Essonne-Sénart (partly)
Communauté d'agglomération de Marne et Gondoire
Communauté d'agglomération Melun Val de Seine
Communauté d'agglomération Paris - Vallée de la Marne
Communauté d'agglomération du Pays de Fontainebleau
Communauté d'agglomération du Pays de Meaux
Communauté d'agglomération Roissy Pays de France (partly)
Val d'Europe Agglomération
Communauté de communes de la Bassée - Montois
Communauté de communes de la Brie des Rivières et Châteaux
Communauté de communes La Brie Nangissienne
Communauté de communes des Deux Morin
Communauté de communes Gâtinais-Val de Loing
Communauté de communes Moret Seine et Loing
Communauté de communes de l'Orée de la Brie (partly)
Communauté de communes du Pays de l'Ourcq
Communauté de communes du Pays de Montereau
Communauté de communes Pays de Nemours
Communauté de communes Plaines et Monts de France
Communauté de communes Les Portes Briardes Entre Villes et Forêts
Communauté de communes du Provinois
Communauté de communes du Val Briard

References

Seine-et-Marne